Aguada Guzmán is a village and municipality in the El Cuy Department in Río Negro Province in the northern Patagonian section of Argentina. Its only access is via Provincial Route 74, off a dirt road.

Population
It has 117 inhabitants (INDEC, 2001), representing a decrease of 26.8% compared to 160 inhabitants (INDEC, 1991) in the previous census.

References

External links
Aguada Guzmán web portal
Geographical coordinates and NASA, Google images of Aguada Guzmán

Populated places in Río Negro Province